Lori McNeil and Helena Suková were the defending champions but did not compete that year.

Katrina Adams and Pam Shriver won in the final 3–6, 6–1, 6–4 against Patty Fendick and Jill Hetherington.

Seeds
Champion seeds are indicated in bold text while text in italics indicates the round in which those seeds were eliminated. The top seeded team received a bye into the quarterfinals.

 Katrina Adams /  Pam Shriver (champions)
 Patty Fendick /  Jill Hetherington (final)
 Beth Herr /  Candy Reynolds (first round)
 Ann Henricksson /  Iwona Kuczyńska (first round)

Draw

References
 1989 U.S. Women's Hard Court Championships Doubles Draw

Women's Doubles
Doubles
1989 in American tennis
Women's sports in Connecticut